John Reginald Schofield (8 February 1931 – 1 November 2006) was an English footballer who played as a goalkeeper in the Football League for Birmingham City and Wrexham.

Life and career
Schofield was born in Atherstone, Warwickshire, in 1931. He played football for Ansley Hall Colliery, Grendon and Nuneaton Borough before signing a professional contract with Birmingham City in February 1950, and spent the next decade as backup to Gil Merrick. In November 1957, he was injured in an explosion at Baddesley Colliery in Warwickshire, where he worked as a miner, and three years later, he fractured his skull while playing in goal against Manchester United. It was in 1959 that Schofield took over as Birmingham's first choice. He played on the losing side in two Inter-Cities Fairs Cup finals, against Barcelona in 1960 and Roma in 1961, and for the winners of the 1963 Football League Cup Final against city rivals Aston Villa.

With advancing age and the arrival of Jim Herriot, Schofield lost his place in the Birmingham team, and was transferred to Wrexham in 1966. He lost his place in late 1967, and spent a month on loan at Cork Hibernians of the League of Ireland. In 1968, he became player-manager of Atherstone Town, and also played for Bromsgrove Rovers and Tamworth, before returning to Atherstone as manager. In later life, he ran an off-licence in his home town of Atherstone.

Schofield was married to Grace née Finney; by 1963 the couple had two children. He died in Coventry on 1 November 2006 at the age of 75.

Honours
Birmingham City
 Football League Second Division: 1954–55
 Inter-Cities Fairs Cup finalist: 1958–60, 1960–61
 Football League Cup: 1962–63

References

1931 births
2006 deaths
English footballers
People from Atherstone
Association football goalkeepers
Nuneaton Borough F.C. players
Birmingham City F.C. players
Wrexham A.F.C. players
Cork Hibernians F.C. players
Atherstone Town F.C. players
Bromsgrove Rovers F.C. players
Tamworth F.C. players
English Football League players
English football managers
Atherstone Town F.C. managers